Keno City Mining Museum is a history museum located in Keno City, Yukon, Canada. It was established around 1979 and has artifacts related to the area's gold and silver mining.

The museum occupies Jackson Hall, the city's former community centre built in 1922.
It was established in 1979 with the assistance of Terry J. Levicki, a geologist who worked for United Keno Hill Mines Ltd., a company in Elsa.

The museum is open to visitors from June to September. Around 1991, the museum received roughly 500 visitors each month during its annual four months of operation.

Artifacts
The museum displays objects such as equipment, and memorabilia. It has a large collection of photographs on the second floor and a garage across the street that stores bigger items. Some of the artifacts are as follows:

Listerine bottle circa 1900
Rocking wooden washer
Tins of Lucky Strike Cola
The original telephone exchange that was used to send and receive all calls at the time
Handmade axes
Large saws that were needed to create ice blocks
Safety helmets
Drill bits
A bucket that was hand-cranked to bring ore to the surface from underground locations
An addressograph for producing employee pay checks that is said to have been used up until about 1981.
The upstairs houses a myriad of old photos.

References

External links

 Examples of images on display

Museums in Yukon
1979 establishments in Yukon
Museums established in 1979